is a railway line in Wakayama Prefecture, Japan. It is the sole line of the Wakayama Electric Railway Co., Ltd. The 14.3 km route extends from Wakayama Station in the city of Wakayama to Kishi Station in neighboring Kinokawa. Including the terminals, the Kishigawa Line has 14 stations. The line is single-track and is electrified at 1,500 V DC. Prior to April 1, 2006, the line was part of the Nankai Electric Railway system.

History
The Sando Light Railway Co. opened the Wakayama - Sando section between 1916 and 1917, and extended the line to Kishi in 1933.

The line was electrified at 600 V DC between 1941 and 1943, and was acquired by the Nankai Electric Railway Co. in 1961.

CTC signalling was commissioned in 1993, and the Wakayama Electric Railway Co. acquired the line in 2006, increasing the line voltage to 1500 V DC in 2012.

Rolling stock and service 
The Kishigawa Line uses 6 sets (12 cars) of 2270 series electric multiple units (EMUs), originally built for Nankai and transferred to the new operator, together with the tracks and other assets of the Kishigawa Line. Some of the cars have been repainted with the design by industrial designer Eiji Mitooka, who designed the type 9200 "MOMO" tram of Okayama Electric Tramway and various trains of JR Kyushu, including the 800 Series Shinkansen, while others are still in the Nankai livery.

In the mornings and evenings, the service operates three to four times each hour; at off-peak times, two per hour is the norm. The trains are driver-only operated, and do not have conductors.

Stations

Features 
In addition to the new design of the rolling stock, the operator is eager to attract passengers through unique measures such as the following:
 Before trains arrive at Kishi Station or after trains leave there, The Beatles song "Strawberry Fields Forever" is played.
 Kishi Station appointed a cat named Tama as its stationmaster, complete with miniature stationmaster hat.

See also
 List of railway lines in Japan

References
This article incorporates material from the corresponding article in the Japanese Wikipedia

External links 
 Wakayama Electric Railway Co., Ltd. 

Railway lines in Japan
Rail transport in Wakayama Prefecture
1067 mm gauge railways in Japan